The Mount Vernon Clippers were an Ohio–Pennsylvania League minor league baseball team based in Mount Vernon, Ohio that played in 1905. The team – the only known club to come out of Mount Vernon – was managed by Bill Goodrich. The team was called "Bill's Clippers" by local news media.

References

Baseball teams established in 1905
Defunct minor league baseball teams
1905 establishments in Ohio
Defunct baseball teams in Ohio
Baseball teams disestablished in 1905
Ohio-Pennsylvania League teams